Stivi Paskoski (born 1974 or 1975) is an Macedonian American actor. He hosted the TV series Video Power as Johnny Arcade and played Pete McGonagle on Brotherhood.  Paskoski has also appeared in the film Cash Only and episodes of Homicide: Life on the Street, Third Watch, Law & Order: Criminal Intent,  Law & Order, and Louie.

Filmography

References

External links
 

Living people
American male television actors
American game show hosts
Year of birth uncertain
Place of birth missing (living people)
American male film actors
20th-century American male actors
21st-century American male actors
Year of birth missing (living people)